Raymond Vanier (6 August 1895 – 15  August  1965) was a pioneering French aviator. Vanier played a key role in the development of French and Spanish civil aviation, despite being less well-known to the general public than Jean Mermoz, Henri Guillaumet or Antoine de Saint-Exupéry.

Career 
Vanier was born in Orléans. During the First World War, he began as an NCO in the artillery, transferring to become a fighter pilot and gaining a strong reputation as well as becoming highly decorated. After World War I, Vanier was hired as a pilot for the newly-developing airlines of Pierre-Georges Latécoère, who was based in Toulouse, establishing connections to the French Colonies.  These lines later became known as Aéropostale and Vanier is considered a pioneer of their night postal services.  Vanier joined “Latécoère” on the 3 June 1919.  He became its station manager in Málaga, and then in Barcelona. In the same year, he opened up Spanish routes and subsequently he set up connections to South America, beginning in 1927.  He ended his career as head of the postal department of Air France in 1948.

Vanier broke the record for emergency landings, saving a number of his comrades.  He is mentioned with humour in a biography of Saint-Exupéry, arriving at the scene of one of the latter’s many crashes.  Raymond Vanier is buried in the cemetery of Père-Lachaise (Division 3) (Photos on Flickr).   The routes he instigated have continued to operate in Spain, Morocco, the Sahara, and throughout South America.

Founder of Barcelona International Airport 

On December 25, 1918, Latécoère took off from Toulouse - Montaudran to arrive after a 2h 20min flight in Barcelona, landing on the racetrack Can Tunis, used since 1910 for air shows. After this flight, Latécoère outlined the need for Barcelona to have adequate facilities to receive and refuel aircraft of the Airmail Line. The choice fell on the airfield "The Volateria", located in the town of "El Prat de llobregat."  This had been used since 1916 by the School of Aviation “Pujol Comabella Hereter” and included the school’s workshops. On January 7, 1919, Beppo de Massimi signed a cooperation agreement with the workshops at Hereter. But in December 1919, following a disagreement over the financial conditions of use of "Volateria" Raymond Vanier, then Chief of Aerodromes for Latécoère, was charged to find another location not too far away.
 
In March 1920, a new location, 800 metres long, on a floodplain, in very poor condition and under-served with facilities was drained, flattened, gradually equipped with workshops, hangars, telephone and radio telegraph.  Later nighttime lighting was installed and even, in 1932, a passenger terminal. Known as "El Frances Camp", it in turn bore the names in Spanish "Aerodromo Latécoère", "Aerodromo of Aeropostale," then "Aerodromo Air France." This land is now fully covered by the Barcelona International Airport.

Autobiography “Tout pour la ligne” 

The summary published in the 2006 re-edition of Vanier’s autobiography is as follows: ″Many books have been devoted to the pioneering of aviation in France.  Often these are written a posteriori by researchers, journalists or novelists, exalting their heroic exploits. “Tout pour la ligne” on the other hand, was written by a pioneer himself. According to his personal notes, Raymond Vanier speaks directly with modesty and rigor of his working day life of more than forty years. He describes the history of the establishment of regular and reliable commercial airlines.  His book is written in a spare style making us re-live the story with simplicity and passion.″

References 

 Mémoire d’Aéropostale – Ses grandes figures – Raymond Vanier; https://web.archive.org/web/20160304004140/http://www.memoire-aeropostale.com/index.php?pg=figures-vanier&lang=fr; accessed 24 Mar 2013.
 Pionniers de l’aviation – Aéropostale - VANIER Raymond (1895-1965); http://www.appl-lachaise.net/appl/article.php3?id_article=912; accessed 24 Mar 2013.
 Mémoire d’Aéropostale, A360.org; ; accessed 24 Mar 2013.
Pierre-Georges Latécoère
 Autobiography: Vanier R. "Tout pour la Ligne," original edition: Paris : France-Empire, 1960; Reprint: Loubatières, 2006; .
Tomb of Raymond Vanier in cemetery of Père-Lachaise: https://www.flickr.com/photos/33784579@N05/7620333932/in/set-72157626520191327/

Dendrotek 20:43, 23 March 2013 (UTC)

French World War I pilots
1895 births
1965 deaths
Burials at Père Lachaise Cemetery
People from Orléans
Recipients of the Croix de Guerre 1914–1918 (France)
Recipients of the Legion of Honour
French aviation record holders